Fairview District 72 is a school district headquartered in Skokie, Illinois. It serves Kindergarten through 8th grade in a single facility.

References

External links
 

School districts in Cook County, Illinois
Education in Skokie, Illinois